Haldia  is a terminal railway station on the Panskura–Haldia branch line and is located in Purba Medinipur district in the Indian state of West Bengal.  It serves Haldia  industrial area.

History
The Howrah–Kharagpur line was opened in 1865.

The Panskura–Durgachak line was opened in 1968, at a time when Haldia Port was being constructed. It was subsequently extended to Haldia.

Electrification
The Howrah–Kharagpur line was electrified in 1967–69. The Panskura–Haldia line was electrified in 1974–76.

New line
Indian Railways propose to lay a new line connecting  and Haldia, with the distance being shorter by 70  km than the Howrah–Haldia track.

References

External links

 

Railway stations in Purba Medinipur district
Kharagpur railway division
Kolkata Suburban Railway stations
Haldia
Transport in Haldia